The American Athletic Conference Pitcher of the Year is a college softball award given to the American Athletic Conference's most outstanding pitcher. The award has been given annually since 2014. Georgina Corrick won the award a record four times.

Key

Winners

Winners by school

References

Awards established in 2014
Pitcher
NCAA Division I softball conference players of the year